Dark Horse Comics is an American comic book company. These are the ongoing and limited series publications it has released under its imprints.

Comics' Greatest World/Dark Horse Heroes

Legend

Maverick

Project Black Sky

Rocket Comics

Dark Horse Comics imprints